CNAF may refer to:

 Stadionul CNAF
 Caisse nationale des allocations familiales, see Caisse d'allocations familiales
 Chinese National Armed Forces, a former name of the Republic of China Armed Forces
 China National Aviation Fuel
 Commander, Naval Air Forces, United States Navy
 Commercial National Financial
 A division of Istituto Nazionale di Fisica Nucleare, in Bologna, Italy